Laskiainen is a celebration with Finnish origins, which includes both pagan and ecclesiastic traditions, and is often described as a "mid-winter sliding festival". 

In clerical sense, Laskiainen is associated with Shrove Tuesday (a.k.a. Fat Tuesday) and is a celebration of the beginning of Lent that takes place before Easter. In Northern Europe, this tradition has been practiced from at least the 7th century onward, and in Catholic countries – in form of carnivals – even before that.

Laskiainen in Finland

Etymology 
The etymology of the word "laskiainen" has been uncertain. Candidates for the source of the word have been "laskeutua" ("to descend", as in descent to fasting) or "laskea" ("to count", as in counting days until Easter). According to a third proposal, the word comes from the old Romance term carne lasciare ("to leave meat"), with the latter part having changed into a Finnish form.

As Laskiainen is called "fettisdag" ("fatty tuesday") in Swedish after the French name "Mardi Gras", one possible explanation for the Finnish name is simply "läskitiistai" ("fatty Tuesday"). The Finnish word "läski" comes from the Swedish word "fläsk" meaning pork meat and pork fat. "Fläsktisdag" is also part of Swedish culinary traditions.

Traditions 

The traditions of Laskiainen consist largely of merrymaking and feasts.

Many of the Finnish Laskiainen traditions are probably based from an old work feast, where women stopped altering linen, hemp and wool and spinning them into yarn. Surviving old Laskiainen traditions include downhill sled riding and riding a sled around a pole. Laskiainen is no longer connected with the growth of linen, but is instead a feast of saying goodbye to the dark winter and waiting for spring.

After the Reformation, Finns no longer observed fasting, but many beliefs and restrictions stayed in the people's minds. Laskiainen remained a peasant work feast, most importantly as a day belonging to women's work. An ancient European New Year's Day is situated around Laskiainen, which has led to many folk beliefs and spells connected to it in historical Finland. Work had to be stopped early in the afternoon on Laskiainen, in order for work to succeed for the rest of the year. The time for sauna was during daylight and bathers had to be quiet in the sauna.

Food 

Food-items typically enjoyed in Finland in Laskiainen include in many cases pea soup with ham, and cheeses.

In the old times, Laskiainen was a time to eat hearty amounts of meat, because the next opportunity to eat meat only came on Easter after fasting. Traditional Laskiainen foods included fatty "rieska" bread and meat soup. The "rieska" bread was made from barley and spiced with pork fat. The meat soup was cooked from peas and rye grain and spiced with pig feet or pig head. The soup was also called pig foot soup.

Desserts are also an integral part of Laskiainen. The best-known after-meal dessert of Laskiainen, often enjoyed either with coffee or tea, is laskiaispulla, which is a sweet roll filled with almond paste or strawberry jam, and whipped cream. This pastry started becoming common in the 19th century.

There were also beliefs about food. Most importantly, food had to be fatty. The more fat glistened on people's fingers and mouths, the more milk the cows gave and the fattier the pigs got. Greasy fingers should not be wiped clean, instead the grease had to be left to clean away on its own. This guaranteed good skills with a scythe. Those who licked their fingers would wound themselves with a scythe. When food was left on the table for the whole day, this guaranteed plenty of food for the rest of the year.

Laskiainen in North America 

In North America too, it is traditional in Laskiainen to have a meal of split-pea soup with ham, and for amusement – as in Finland – to slide down a hill on either snow-covered or iced tracks, often on toboggans.

One of the places where Laskiainen is celebrated outside Europe in form of an annual festival is the community of Palo, located between Aurora and Makinen on the shores of Loon Lake in Minnesota. With this celebration, Palo is the home for one of the longest continuously-held annual Finnish-American festivals in the United States, others being e.g. various Saint Urho's Day festivals held each March 16 both in Canada and the United States, and the FinnFest USA festivals, which have taken place in locations throughout the United States, typically hosted by communities with connections to Finnish-American cultural history.

Many Finnish-North-American groups and clubs host various Laskiainen celebrations, but the large one which developed and became more organized in Palo in the 1930s is notable for both its size and longevity.

References

European culture
Finnish culture
Public holidays in Finland
Finnish-American history
Holidays based on the date of Easter
Mardi Gras

de:Fastnachtsdienstag
es:Martes de Carnaval
et:Vastlapäev
fi:Laskiainen
fr:Mardi gras
ru:масленица 
sv:Fettisdagen